The 1979 Masters Tournament was the 43rd Masters Tournament, held April 12–15 at Augusta National Golf Club in Augusta, Georgia.

Fuzzy Zoeller won his only Masters, the first of his two major titles, with a birdie on the second hole of a playoff with Ed Sneed and Tom Watson. Jack Nicklaus climbed up the leaderboard on Sunday with a 69 (−3), but bogeyed 17 to finish a stroke out of the playoff; Tom Kite had a double bogey at 16 for an even par 72 in the final round to finish fifth, three strokes back.

Second and third round leader Sneed seemed to have a commanding three-shot lead with only three holes to go, but bogeyed the final three holes to card a final round 76 (+4) and fell into the playoff. It was the debut of the sudden-death format at Augusta, adopted by the Masters in 1976. Its last playoff was nine years earlier in 1970, then a full 18-hole round on Monday.

The sudden-death playoff began on the tenth hole, a downhill par-4, where all three players missed birdie putts and parred.

Zoeller, age 27, was the first to win the Masters in his initial attempt since Gene Sarazen in 1935, the second edition of the tournament. In his fifth season on tour, it was Zoeller's second win, the first came less than three months earlier at the Andy Williams-San Diego Open Invitational. He won his other major five years later at the 1984 U.S. Open, also in a playoff.

The second round was suspended for two hours Friday afternoon due to heavy rain and tornado warnings. Due to the delay, not all golfers were able to complete their second rounds on Friday and the cut line was not determined until these rounds were completed on Saturday morning. Normally scheduled to conclude on the second Sunday of April, this Masters was held a week later, as was 1984.

Field
1. Masters champions
Tommy Aaron, Gay Brewer, Billy Casper, Charles Coody, Raymond Floyd (8,9,11,12), Doug Ford, Bob Goalby, Jack Nicklaus (3,4,8,9,11,12), Arnold Palmer, Gary Player (3,8,9,11), Sam Snead, Art Wall Jr., Tom Watson (3,8,9,10,11,12)

George Archer, Jack Burke Jr., Jimmy Demaret, Ralph Guldahl, Claude Harmon, Ben Hogan, Herman Keiser, Cary Middlecoff, Byron Nelson, Henry Picard, and Gene Sarazen did not play.

The following categories only apply to Americans

2. U.S. Open champions (last five years)
Lou Graham (12), Hubert Green (8,11,12), Hale Irwin (8,9,12), Andy North (9), Jerry Pate (8,9,10,11)

3. The Open champions (last five years)
Johnny Miller (9)

4. PGA champions (last five years)
Dave Stockton (9,12), Lee Trevino (8,9,10,11), Lanny Wadkins (8,11,12)

John Mahaffey (10,11) withdrew because of injury.

5. 1978 U.S. Amateur semi-finalists
Bobby Clampett (7,a), John Cook (6,7,a), Scott Hoch (7,a), Mike Peck (a)

6. Previous two U.S. Amateur and Amateur champions

John Fought forfeited his exemption by turning professional.

7. Members of the 1978 U.S. Eisenhower Trophy team
Jay Sigel (a)

8. Top 24 players and ties from the 1978 Masters Tournament
Wally Armstrong, Miller Barber, Andy Bean (9,10,11), Rod Funseth (11), Joe Inman (9), Don January (12), Tom Kite (11), Billy Kratzert (9), Gene Littler, Jerry McGee (12), Lindy Miller, Gil Morgan (10,11), Ed Sneed (12), Leonard Thompson, Tom Weiskopf (9,10)

9. Top 16 players and ties from the 1978 U.S. Open
Mike McCullough, Artie McNickle, J. C. Snead

10. Top eight players and ties from 1978 PGA Championship
Craig Stadler

11. Winners of PGA Tour events since the previous Masters
Bob Byman, Ben Crenshaw, Lee Elder, Jerry Heard, Lon Hinkle, Barry Jaeckel, Bruce Lietzke, Mark McCumber, Mac McLendon, Larry Nelson, Jim Simons, Ron Streck, Fuzzy Zoeller

12. Members of the U.S. 1977 Ryder Cup team
Dave Hill

13. Foreign invitations
Isao Aoki, Seve Ballesteros (8,9), Nick Faldo, David Graham (8), Graham Marsh (10), Peter McEvoy (6,a), Jack Newton (11), Peter Oosterhuis (8), Simon Owen, Masashi Ozaki, Victor Regalado (11), Bob Shearer (9)

Numbers in brackets indicate categories that the player would have qualified under had they been American.

Round summaries

First round
Thursday, April 12, 1979

Second round
Friday, April 13, 1979
Saturday, April 14, 1979

Third round
Saturday, April 14, 1979

Final round
Sunday, April 15, 1979

Final leaderboard

Sources:

Scorecard

Cumulative tournament scores, relative to par
Source:

Playoff 

Sudden-death playoff began on hole #10 and ended at hole #11, when Zoeller birdied.

References

External links
Masters.com – Past winners and results
Augusta.com – 1979 Masters leaderboard and scorecards

1979
1979 in golf
1979 in American sports
1979 in sports in Georgia (U.S. state)
April 1979 sports events in the United States